William Michael Purves (1870 – after 1900) was an Irish professional footballer who played as a right back. He made 40 appearances in the Football League, playing for Small Heath in the 1890s. He played three times for the Irish Football League representative side.

Purves was born in Belfast and played for Glentoran before coming to England to join Small Heath in March 1894. He played in the last three matches of the 1893–94 Football League regular season and in the test match that confirmed their ascent to the First Division. He played every game of the club's first top-flight season, but lost his place to Frank Lester in 1895–96 and returned to Glentoran. From 1900 he acted as Glentoran's trainer.

Notes

References

1870 births
Year of death missing
Association footballers from Belfast
Irish association footballers (before 1923)
Association football fullbacks
Glentoran F.C. players
Birmingham City F.C. players
English Football League players
Date of birth missing
Place of death missing